Mose J. Gingerich is an Amish-born documentary-maker and the author of Amish fiction murder/mystery novels. Gingerich  was born in an Old Order Amish community in Greenwood, Wisconsin, the 9th of 13 children.

Early years
Gingerich (born July 27, 1979) was raised on a 255-acre farm and worked in the fields and sawmill at a very young age. He developed a love for reading as an escape from reality. Books such as Tom Sawyer, Huckleberry Finn, Little Men, Little Women, Big Smoke Mountain, and Heidi influenced his early childhood.

In his early teens, Gingerich  lived in six different Amish communities in the midwest: Wisconsin, Iowa, Missouri, and Kansas. Gingerich taught all eight grades in a one-room schoolhouse for four years.

Excommunication by the Amish
On July 3, 2002, after Mose Gingerich finished his fourth year of teaching, he left the Amish community. Gingerich was banned from further contact with his family and community.

Career
Television career

Amish in the City
In 2004, 1 1/2 years after Gingerich left the Amish, he got an opportunity to be on the reality show Amish in the City, televised on UPN. The show featured six city kids and five ex-Amish kids trying to co-exist in a mansion in the middle of the Hollywood Hills. The season consisted of ten episodes. It was the first major television project done with Amish people. Mose made appearances on several late night shows to help promote Amish in the City, including Jimmy Kimmel Live, Good Morning America, Live with Regis and Kelly, Good Day Live, and radio shows.

Amish at the Altar and Amish Out of Order
In 2009 and 2010, Gingerich shot and produced two documentaries with Stick Figure Productions. Both aired by the National Geographic Channel: Amish at the Altar and Amish Out of the Order. Amish at the Altar featured Eli and Mary Gingerich, a couple who had been married Amish but chose to leave, renewing their wedding vows in the outside world. Amish: Out of the Order featured Mose, a group of his close ex-Amish friends, and the life they are now leading in Columbia, Missouri. The focus of the film was Mose's place as a leader within the ex-Amish community; he often helped the kids with housing, cars, driver's licenses, and jobs.

Writing career

The Caroline Creek Series

In 2021, Mose published Shadows We Remain, a fiction novel and the first in the Caroline Creek Series.                                                  

In 2022, Mose published Caroline Creek Chaos, a fiction novel and the second in the Caroline Creek Series.

Current status
Today Mose lives in mid-Missouri with his wife and three children. For the first eight years after leaving the community, Mose worked in construction, and for six of those years, owned his own construction company, often employing newly escaped [judgmental?] ex-Amish youth who were looking to acclimate into the outside world. In 2010, because of health reasons, Gingerich left construction and moved to sales. He sold cars in Columbia, Missouri, for the next six years.  When the dealership sold in 2016, Gingerich left his job in sales, and started driving truck over the road, delivering freight coast to coast.

Today Mose Gingerich is married.  He and his wife are raising a family of three.  In a recent blog, Gingerich wrote that “while auto sales and trucking aren’t exactly the dream life I envisioned when I left the community, both have served a purpose. Car sales: nothing toughens one to the ways of the world like trying to sell a product to a reluctant customer, and trucking: the solitude of trucking has allowed me to re-visit my passion of reading and writing. In my three years as a trucker, I have listened to an average of over one-hundred audiobooks a year.

Mose’s debut novel, Shadows We Remain, was written at night in the sleeper of his big rig. Shadows We Remain is a work of fiction and the first in the Caroline Creek Series. It can be found in both paper or eBook format, by visiting this link.

Gingerich's most recent blogs and books can also be found on his website at www.amishinthecitymose.com.

In popular culture
The character of Mose Schrute from The Office was named for and inspired by Mose Gingerich.

References

External links
Personal Website: www.amishinthecitymose.com

1979 births
American Amish people
American documentary filmmakers
Living people
People from Greenwood, Wisconsin
People from Columbia, Missouri